The 2010 European Championship was an international American Football competition. The European Championship of American Football is a continental competition contested by the member countries of EFAF and was held in Germany from July 24 to July 31, 2010. The tournament also served as a qualifier for the 2011 IFAF World Championship. Germany, France and Austria qualified.

Group A

Standings

All times are local (UTC+2)

Schedule

Group B

Standings

All times are local (UTC+2)

Schedule

Classification games

5th place game

3rd place game

Final

References

External links
 Official Website
 Schedule of the tournament

European Championship of American football
European Championship
E
2010 in German sport
American football in Germany
Sports competitions in Frankfurt
Sport in Wetzlar
Sport in Wiesbaden
21st century in Frankfurt
European Championship of American football